The Oregon Electric Railway Passenger Station is a historic railroad station in Eugene, Oregon, United States. It was built in 1914 as a station for the Oregon Electric Railway and was designed by A. E. Doyle.

Passenger service by the Oregon Electric Railway was discontinued in 1933, and the station was used as an office and for storage.

Slate Tractor opened an Allis-Chalmers dealership in Eugene on October 22, 1937 with a temporary location on 7th Avenue, moving to the Oregon Electric Station building February 3, 1938.  Shortly thereafter, on July 15, 1938, Edward C. (E.C.) Papé purchased the dealership, starting what is now known as The Papé Group, Inc. E.C. operated his dealership at the station for 4 years before relocating the business to a location on West 1st Street.

In 1961, the station became a branch of the Oregon Museum of Science and Industry (OMSI), the Southwest Oregon Museum of Science and Industry (SWOMSI). After breaking with OMSI in 1978, the Willamette Science and Technology Center (WISTEC) sold the station and gave the proceeds to Lane County to build a children's museum in Alton Baker Park. SWOMSI's displays included train cars adjacent to the building. The train cars became part of the dining facilities for later restaurants located in the station.

Work began to convert the station into a restaurant in 1977. The first restaurant in the space was called "Andy's Eugene Station".

The station was listed on the National Register of Historic Places, as the Oregon Electric Railway Passenger Station, in 1979.

The Oregon Electric Station restaurant operated in the station until permanently closing in 2020. As of 2021, the Lane County History Museum was looking at moving from its original location next to the Lane County Fairgrounds to the railway station.

References

External links
Oregon Electric Station history
Historic photos of Oregon Electric Passenger Station from the University of Oregon Libraries

1914 establishments in Oregon
A. E. Doyle buildings
Buildings and structures in Eugene, Oregon
Culture of Eugene, Oregon
Former railway stations in Oregon
Georgian Revival architecture in Oregon
National Register of Historic Places in Eugene, Oregon
Railway stations in the United States opened in 1914
Railway stations on the National Register of Historic Places in Oregon
Tourist attractions in Eugene, Oregon
Transportation buildings and structures in Lane County, Oregon
Transportation in Eugene, Oregon